The 2009 Pulitzer Prizes were announced on April 20, 2009, the 93rd annual awards.

The New York Times won five awards this year, with the Tampa Bay Times (formerly the St. Petersburg Times) being the only other multi-prize winner with two. Three organizations were awarded prizes for the first time: Las Vegas Sun, East Valley Tribune and The Post-Star.

Journalism

Letters, Drama and Music Awards

Special Citation
Not awarded in 2009.

References

External links
 
 "2009 Pulitzer Prizes for Journalism". The New York Times.
 "2009 Pulitzer Prizes for Letters, Drama and Music". The New York Times.

Pulitzer Prizes by year
Pulitzer Prize
Pulitzer Prize
2009 awards in the United States